Subedar Major and Honorary Captain Chhering Norbu Bodh SC (retd.) (born May 1969, also known as CN Bodh) is a retired personnel of the Indian Army, known for his mountaineering achievements while in the army. Bodh holds a number of Indian summiting records related to 8,000m peaks. Among others, he is the first Indian mountaineer to have climbed six of the fourteen 8000m peaks in the world, and the first Indian to stand atop Lhotse and Annapurna-1.

Personal life 
Bodh hails from the Spiti valley, Himachal Pradesh. He joined the army soon after matriculating from school. He is known to be a devout Tibetan Buddhist.

Mountaineering achievements

Successful 8000m summits 
Bodh is known for having successfully climbed six 8,000m peaks in expeditions conducted by the Indian Army:

 Mt Everest (2001) 
 Mt Annapurna (2002) 
 Mt Lhotse (2003)
 Mt Kanchenjunga (2004) 
 Mt Cho Oyu (2006) 
 Mt Dhaulagiri (2009)

Bodh is the first Indian who summited three, then four, then five, and then six 8000m summits.

Bodh is the first Indian to have set foot on the summits of Annapurna-I and Lhotse.

Others 
Bodh summited Gyagar peak (6,400m) in Spiti in August 1995 and Mana Peak (7,273m) in 2000. He contributed significantly to the successful Army Women Everest Expedition in 2005.

Recognition

Shaurya Chakra 
In 2001, Bodh was awarded the Shaurya Chakra, India's third highest peacetime gallantry award, for successfully summiting Mt Everest under daunting conditions on 23 May 2001. The citation for this award reads as the following:

Tenzing Norgay National Adventure Award 
On 29 August 2006, Bodh was awarded the Tenzing Norgay National Adventure Award, the highest adventure sports honor bestowed by the Government of India, for the year 2005 in the Land Adventure category. This award recognized Bodh for the whole span of his achievements in mountaineering till then.

Others 
Bodh received COAS (Chief of the Army Staff) Commendation Cards on Army Days in 2008 and 2010.

Bodh, a JCO in the Indian army, was made an Honorary Captain while approaching retirement, on account of his distinguished career.

Bodh was regarded among India's best mountaineers in the years when he was climbing 8,000m peaks.

Bodh is an 'Individual Member' of the Indian Mountaineering Foundation (IMF), the Government of India's apex mountaineering body.

References 

Indian mountain climbers
People from Lahaul and Spiti district
Military personnel from Himachal Pradesh
Recipients of the Shaurya Chakra
Recipients of the Tenzing Norgay National Adventure Award
Indian summiters of Mount Everest
Mountain climbers from Himachal Pradesh
Recipients of Indian Mountaineering Foundation's Gold Medal
1969 births
Living people